Kanta may refer to:
Kanta (name)
Kanta (Japanese given name)
Kanta (Hungarian surname)
Kanta (play), a Gujarati play by Manilal Dwivedi
Kanta (shield), traditional shield in Indonesia
Kanta Museum in Argungu, Nigeria
Kanta, a character from Ippatsu Kanta-kun anime
Kanta, a character from My Neighbor Totoro anime
Kulin Kanta, a 1925 Indian silent film 
Shajarur Kanta, a 1967 Bengali mystery novel
Shajarur Kanta (1974 film), a Bengali film
Shajarur Kanta (2015 film), a Bengali film
Kanta, Raebareli, a village in Uttar Pradesh, India

See also
Kantha, type of embroidery popular in eastern South Asia